Rashmi Thackeray (née Patankar) is an Indian journalist and editor of Saamana and Marmik. She is the spouse of Former Chief minister of Maharashtra, Uddhav Thackeray.


Early life and family
Rashmi was born in a middle-class family of Madhav Patankar who runs his own family business in suburban Dombivli. She attended V G Vaze College in Mulund for her Bachelor of Commerce degree. She joined the Life Insurance Corporation of India as a contract employee in 1987. She became the friend of Raj Thackeray's sister Jaywanti and through her came into contact with Uddhav Thackeray. The couple got married in 1989. The couple have two sons, Aditya (Former Cabinet Minister of Tourism and Environment Government of Maharashtra) and Tejas.

References

Living people
People from Mumbai
Spouses of Indian politicians
Indian journalists
Year of birth missing (living people)
Thackeray family